Hautacam is a ski resort in the Pyrenees. It is situated in the Hautes-Pyrénées department, in the Midi-Pyrénées region. In road bicycle racing, the ascent to Hautacam is known as a tough climb, which is used occasionally in the Tour de France.

Cycle racing

Details of climb 
 

Tour de France 
Hautacam first held a Tour de France stage in 1994, won by Luc Leblanc. Since then, it has been used a further five times, including the final mountain stage of the 2014 race.

During the 1996 Tour de France the reign of five time champion Miguel Indurain effectively came to an end when Bjarne Riis launched an attack on Hautacam, claiming the stage victory and putting himself in position to win the Tour which he eventually would.

It was on the climb to Hautacam that Lance Armstrong set up his victory in the 2000 Tour de France, until being disqualified for doping. In appalling weather, the race arrived at the first mountain stage, with Javier Otxoa the only survivor from an early break. On the final climb, Armstrong went off alone into the wind and rain leaving his challengers struggling, pushing Jan Ullrich into second place by four minutes. Once Armstrong had taken the Maillot Jaune, he was never seriously challenged until the end of the race.

Tour de France stage finishes

References

External links
 
Hautacam on Google Maps (Tour de France classic climbs)

Ski stations in France
Tourist attractions in Hautes-Pyrénées
Sports venues in Hautes-Pyrénées